General Bates may refer to:

Charles Loftus Bates (1863–1951), British Army brigadier general
Erastus Newton Bates (1828–1898), Union Army brevet brigadier general
Henry Bates (British Army officer) (1813–1893), British Army general
John C. Bates (1842–1919), U.S. Army lieutenant general
Joshua Hall Bates (1817–1908), Ohio State Militia brigadier general in the American Civil War